The Peter Simmons House is a historic house near Winchester, Tennessee, U.S. It was built in 1820 for Peter Simmons, a settler, planter, and cotton dealer. The house was built on a 400-acre plantation. Simmons grew cotton, and it was sold in New Orleans.

The house has been listed on the National Register of Historic Places since August 16, 1977.

References

National Register of Historic Places in Franklin County, Tennessee
Houses completed in 1820